Dundurn Press is one of the largest Canadian-owned book publishing companies of adult and children's fiction and non-fiction. The company publishes Canadian literature, history, biography, politics and arts. Dundurn has about 2500 books in print, and averages around one hundred new titles each year. Dundurn Press was established in 1972 by Kirk Howard, In 2009, Dundurn forged a co-publishing partnership with the Ontario Genealogical Society, and in 2011, Dundurn purchased Napoleon & Company and Blue Butterfly Books. In 2013, Dundurn acquired Thomas Allen Publishers, the publishing branch of Thomas Allen & Son Limited. Thomas Allen & Son Limited is a Canadian book distributor, and remains Canada's oldest family-owned and operated distributor, having been in continuous operation for over 90 years. Dundurn Press authors include Lincoln Alexander, Linda McQuaig, Ted Barris, Michael Coren, Xue Yiwei, and Austin Clarke.  

In January 2019, Howard sold Dundurn Press to a consortium of Canadian technology investors. They hired Kwame Scott Fraser, who became the second publisher in the history of Dundurn Press, and Howard became Publisher Emeritus. Fraser hired acquiring editors Julie Mannell and Russell Smith, and launched a new imprint for literary fiction and memoir called Rare Machines.

References

External links
 Dundurn Press website

Book publishing companies of Canada